Web Platform Installer (Web PI) is a freeware, closed-source package management system that installs non-commercial development tools and their dependencies that are part of Microsoft Web Platform, including:
 Internet Information Services
 WebMatrix
 Visual Web Developer Express Edition
 Microsoft SQL Server Express Edition
 .NET Framework
 Silverlight Tools for Visual Studio
 PHP
 WordPress
 Umbraco
 Drupal
 Joomla!
 Orchard

The ability to install third-party software was added in version 2.0, released September 24, 2009. , Web PI can install 82 titles.  Web PI 2.0's options are populated dynamically at runtime from Microsoft's servers, allowing installation options to be updated without the need to download newer versions of the Web PI itself.

On July 7, 2010, Microsoft announced Web PI 3 which includes WebMatrix, a new set of integrated tools for web development. Web PI 3 installs additional tools for web development including IIS Developer Express, SQL Server Compact and DotNetNuke.

Web PI features an offline mode where products can be downloaded to a local cache on a machine where internet access is available and then use these cached files on a different machine later. However, Web PI is still not usable in environments where Internet connectivity and local administrator privileges are mutually exclusive (i.e. a given process can either authenticate through a transparent proxy, or can have High or System integrity level, but not both).

The Microsoft Web Platform Installer (WebPI) has been retired since July 1, 2022. For more information please see this blog post: https://blogs.iis.net/iisteam/web-platform-installer-end-of-support-feed

See also
 Solution stack: set of software subsystems or components needed to create a complete platform
 Windows Package Manager: an open-source package manager for Windows 10 and Windows 11

References

External links
 
 Introduction to WebPI and WebPI Command-Line Utility

Microsoft development tools
Proprietary package management systems
Discontinued Microsoft software